The  is an electric multiple unit (EMU) train type operated by the Tokyo subway operator Tokyo Metro in Tokyo, Japan, between 1974 and 2022. The design is based on the earlier Tokyo Metro 6000 series trains used on the Tokyo Metro Chiyoda Line.

Operations
7000 series trainsets operated on the following lines.

Formations

, the fleet consists of six ten-car sets and 15 eight-car sets, formed as shown below with car 1 at the northern end.

10-car sets

only 7102F

 Cars 2, 4, and 8 are each fitted with two lozenge-type pantographs.
 Car 9 is designated as a moderately air-conditioned car.

8-car sets

 Cars 3 and 7 are each fitted with two lozenge-type pantographs.
 Car 7 is designated as a moderately air-conditioned car.

Interior
Passenger accommodation consists of longitudinal bench seating throughout. Cars 2 and 9 in the ten-car sets and cars 2 and 7 in the eight-car sets each have a wheelchair space. Priority seating is provided at the end of each car.

History

The 7000 series was introduced into service on 30 October 1974, when the Yurakucho Line first opened. Its design is derived from that of the 6000 series developed for the Chiyoda Line. By 1989, 340 vehicles were built, which were formed into 34 ten-car sets.

Refurbishment 
Between 2007 and 2009, the 7000 series fleet was refurbished coinciding with use on Fukutoshin Line services. The sets were fitted with new driver's cabs, CCTV equipment, updated traction and braking systems, automatic train operation, and other miscellaneous technical improvements. Some sets were also shortened to eight cars. The sets were also reliveried with brown, gold, and white stripes coinciding with use on Fukutoshin Line services. They originally sported a yellow bodyside line when used primarily on Yurakucho Line services.

Withdrawal 
After the refurbishment programme, a significant portion of the 7000 series fleet was withdrawn; four of these sets were shipped to Indonesia in 2010.

In 2020, Tokyo Metro unveiled the 17000 series, which was intended to replace the remaining 7000 series sets by the end of fiscal 2022. As of April 2022, all operations have ended.

Overseas operations

Four 7000 series ten-car sets (7117, 7121, 7122, and 7123) were shipped to Indonesia in 2010 for use on suburban services operated by KAI Commuter (previously called "KA Commuter Jabodetabek" or "KRL Jabodetabek") in Jakarta. The four sets were reduced to eight-car formations and are formed as follows, based at Depok Depot.

The two M1 cars in each set are equipped with two pantographs.

Accidents and incidents
2013 Bintaro train crash: On 9 December 2013, set 7121 (KRL 1131) collided with a Pertamina tank truck at a level crossing at the Bintaro Permai intersection on the Rangkasbitung Line near Bintaro, South Tangerang, Indonesia, leading to 7 deaths and 45 injuries. The front two carriages of set 7121 as well as the tank truck were both destroyed in the ensuing fire. Set 7121 was scrapped in December 2014.

References

External links

 Tokyo Metro 7000 series information 

Electric multiple units of Japan
7000 series
Train-related introductions in 1974
Electric multiple units of Indonesia
1500 V DC multiple units of Japan
Kawasaki multiple units
Nippon Sharyo multiple units
Kinki Sharyo multiple units
Tokyu Car multiple units